The Mountains-to-Sea State Trail (MST) is a long-distance trail for hiking and backpacking, that traverses North Carolina from the Great Smoky Mountains to the Outer Banks.  The trail's western endpoint is at Clingman's Dome, where it connects to the Appalachian Trail in the Great Smoky Mountains National Park.  Its eastern endpoint is in Jockey's Ridge State Park on the tallest sand dune on the east coast.  The trail is envisioned as a scenic backbone of an interconnected trail system spanning the state.  As such, the trail's route attempts to connect as many trail systems and natural scenic areas as practicable. A little over half of the trail is complete in multiple segments across the state.

The Mountains-to-Sea State Park Trail was made an official land-based unit of the state park system by the General Assembly on August 2, 2000. Each of these tracts is leased to local governments for management as nature parks, under the guidance of the NC Division of Parks and Recreation (NCDPR). The vast majority of the foot trail is located on lands not directly managed as part of a state park unit.

The trail is a part of the North Carolina State Trails System, which is a section of NCDPR, and as of January 2019,  of trail has been designated as a part of the MST by NCDPR.

The segments of MST along the Blue Ridge Parkway were designated as National Recreation Trail in 2005.

Incorporated trails
The MST incorporates several other notable trails as part of its route.

The MST shares several miles of its route with the Appalachian Trail near the MST's western trail-head.
Art Loeb Trail
The MST follows most of the Tanawha Trail's length.
The MST shares most of the Sauratown Trail's route, which is the only bridle trail that connects two NC state parks and is the longest trail on private owned lands in the state.
A recent addition to the trail is the Haw River Trail which begins at Haw River State Park in Guilford and Chatham Counties and continues to Cane Creek in southern Alamance County.  This addition is under review pending appeals and resolution of access issues.
The trail follows the Eno River State Park trail system to the Falls Lake Trail, which it follows to the Neuse River Trail. 
The MST follows the Neuse River Trail for its length.
The MST follows the entire length of the Neusiok Trail.

Camping
Hikers should be aware that the Mountains-To-Sea State Trail does contain camping restrictions across its route.  Hikers should research and follow all rules and regulations for camping, as the MST does cross through lands managed by various public and private land agencies & individuals.

In the mountain section, starting in the Great Smoky Mountains National Park, camping is allowed at permissible campsites with a back-country permit. Please contact the GSMNP back-country office for permit and reservation information.

Camping within the Blue Ridge Parkway corridor is prohibited except for permissible parkway campgrounds (Doughton Park, Julian Price Park, Linville Falls, Crabtree Meadows, and Mt. Pisgah).  In some areas, hikers can cross the BRP boundary lines into the Nantalhala and Pisgah National Forests to camp at well-established campsites.  Planning is being done to create designated, private campsites for the MST on parkway land; however, the only backpack site currently open is in Julian Price Park.

On the North Carolina Piedmont section of the MST, camping is not permitted along the Sauratown Trail section (from Pilot Mountain to Hanging Rock State Parks) since the trail is managed and maintained on land leased from private landowners.  A list of nearby campgrounds and lodging is maintained on the Sauratown Trails Association Website.  There are three privately managed campgrounds a short distance off the Sauratown Trail.

Camping inside the North Carolina State Parks is only allowed at permissible camping sites and campgrounds.  Large sections of the Falls Lake State Recreation Area, and neighboring public lands managed by the Army Corps of Engineers, also prohibit camping.

Stealth camping or any illegal camping along the MST is highly discouraged.  Possible citations and fines may be enforced if such camping is found by the managing land agency.

Park lands
The MST as a State Trail unit of the state park system encompasses 691 acres of land in three tracts.  The NC Division of Parks and Recreation (NCDPR) leases each of these tracts to local governments for operation as nature parks.

Shallow Ford Natural Area
Shallow Ford Natural Area consists of  located in Alamance County along the banks of the Haw River, and it is managed by the Alamance County Recreation and Parks Department.  The natural area has a small, volunteer built trail network, which includes the MST, a few primitive campsites, a canoe access and a picnic area.  The natural area was acquired to help fill in a gap in the MST.

Richardson-Taylor Preserve
The Richardson-Taylor Preserve, formally known as the Morton-Richardson Tract, is a new  nature preserve that was jointly acquired by the Guilford County Open Space Program and the State of North Carolina.  The preserve was acquired in two parts, the Taylor Tract and the Richardson Tract.  The  Taylor Tract was bought by the state park system from the Morton family, who also sold Grandfather Mountain to the state.  The Richardson Tract was bought by Guilford County, partly using grants from the state.  Both tracts are intended to be managed together as a buffer for the Greensboro Watershed and as a corridor for the MST to reach Haw River State Park from the watershed trails.  The Greensboro Parks & Recreation Department manages the preserve with guidance from the Guildford County Open Space Committee and the NC Division of Parks and Recreation.

Clayton River Walk
A third tract was leased to the Town of Clayton for use as part of the Clayton River Walk.  The River Walk serves as an extension of the Neuse River Trail into Johnston County, and it is also utilized as part of the East Coast Greenway's route.  NCDPR owns the northernmost property the River Walk crosses.

List of destinations
The trail currently passes or is planned to pass through several notable natural areas in North Carolina.  This list notes them from west to east:

Great Smoky Mountains National Park (Location of western trail-head)
The Blue Ridge Parkway (The trail roughly follows the parkway throughout the mountains.)
Nantahala National Forest
Middle Prong Wilderness
Pisgah National Forest
Mount Pisgah Recreation Area (Blue Ridge Parkway)
Bent Creek Experimental Forest
Craggy Gardens Recreation Area (Blue Ridge Parkway)
Mount Mitchell State Park
Lake James State Park (connected via designated spur trail)
Linville Gorge Wilderness
Harper Creek Wilderness Study Area
Lost Cove Wilderness Study Area
Grandfather Mountain State Park
Julian Price Memorial Park (Blue Ridge Parkway)
Moses H. Cone Memorial Park (Blue Ridge Parkway)
E. B. Jeffress Park (Blue Ridge Parkway)
Doughton Park (Blue Ridge Parkway)
Stone Mountain State Park
Pilot Mountain State Park
Hanging Rock State Park
Greensboro Watershed
Richardson-Taylor Preserve (Part of the State Park Trail)
Haw River State Park
Shallow Ford Natural Area (Part of the State Park Trail)
Occoneechee Mountain State Natural Area
Eno River State Park
Falls Lake State Recreation Area
Cliffs of the Neuse State Park
Cherry Branch – Minnesott Ferry
Croatan National Forest
Cedar Island National Wildlife Refuge
Cedar Island – Ocracoke Ferry
Cape Hatteras National Seashore
Hatteras – Ocracoke Ferry
Pea Island National Wildlife Refuge
Jockey's Ridge State Park (Location of eastern trail-head)

Photo gallery
These are images of or along the MST going from west to east:

References

External links

 
 Friends of the Mountains to Sea Trail — Non-profit organization that maintains, builds and promotes the trail.
 Guide to the Mountains-to-Sea Trail Records 2008-2017
 North Carolina State Trails Program
 Session Law 2000-157 made the MST a state park.
 Shallow Ford Natural Area Website

National Recreation Trails in North Carolina
Hiking trails in Great Smoky Mountains National Park
Long-distance trails in the United States
State parks of North Carolina
State parks of the Appalachians
Protected areas established in 2000
Croatan National Forest
Nantahala National Forest
Pisgah National Forest
Blue Ridge Parkway